Francesco Damiani (born 4 October 1958) is an Italian former professional boxer who competed from 1985 to 1993. He was the first WBO heavyweight champion, having held the title from 1989 to 1991, as well as the European heavyweight title from 1987 to 1989. As an amateur he won silver medals in the super-heavyweight division at the 1982 World Championships and 1984 Summer Olympics.

Amateur career
He participated at 1980 Summer Olympics in Moscow, where he lost to the eventual silver medalist Piotr Zaev in the quarter-finals. The following year he won the European Amateur Championships in Tampere. At the 1982 World Amateur Boxing Championships in Munich, he beat the legendary Teofilo Stevenson but lost to Tyrell Biggs in the final. In 1983 in Varna he became European champion for the second time, beating Ulli Kaden. He was ranked world's #1 super heavyweight by the AIBA in 1984 (ahead of Tyrell Biggs, who was ranked #2.) At the 1984 Summer Olympics in Los Angeles he again lost to Biggs in the final, despite Biggs' home crowd booing at the judges decision who believed Damiani won the contest (since he threw more punches and was moving forward for most of the contest) which led to the leading BBC boxing commentator Harry Carpenter, who was commentating for the BBC sport Olympic coverage, to say that "..it was the worst boxing decision in all my years of boxing commentating".
Francesco Damiani was the Italian boxing team coach for the London 2012 Summer Olympics.

Olympic results 
1980:
 Round of 16: Defeated Teodor Pîrjol (Romania) 4-1
 Quarterfinal: Lost to Piotr Zaev (Soviet Union) 0-5

1984:
 1st round bye
 Defeated William Isangura (Tanzania) RSC 2
 Defeated Robert Wells (Great Britain) RSC 3
 Lost to Tyrell Biggs (United States) 1-4

Professional career
Damiani began his professional career on a tear, with 27 consecutive victories over limited opposition. He defeated Tyrell Biggs in a rematch of their Olympic meeting, stopping him on a cut, and then won the newly created WBO Heavyweight title with a 3rd-round KO victory over Johnny DuPlooy on 6 May 1989. Damiani hit a brick wall when he took on 1988 Olympic Gold Medalist Ray Mercer in 1991 in Atlantic City, New Jersey. Damiani was ahead on points but went down after a Mercer left uppercut broke his nose, and he was counted out by the referee in the 9th round.

In 1991, he had been chosen to face Evander Holyfield for the undisputed heavyweight championship, but an injury prevented him from getting into the ring.

Damiani would come back in 1992 to take a decision over former champion Greg Page, but quit in the 8th round of the following bout versus Oliver McCall in 1993, ending his career.

In 1993 former mobster Sammy Gravano testified under oath that in the late 80s he attempted to arrange a fixed fight between Damiani, who Gravano alleged was associated with an organized crime family in Italy, and Renaldo Snipes. The winner (Snipes) would fight Tyson, however Damiani lost his fight with Ray Mercer before the Snipes bout and that put him out of the picture for a major fight.

Professional boxing record

References

External links
 
 
 

1958 births
Living people
Sportspeople from the Province of Ravenna
Olympic boxers of Italy
Boxers at the 1980 Summer Olympics
Boxers at the 1984 Summer Olympics
World heavyweight boxing champions
World Boxing Organization champions
Olympic silver medalists for Italy
Olympic medalists in boxing
European Boxing Union champions
Italian male boxers
AIBA World Boxing Championships medalists
Medalists at the 1984 Summer Olympics
Super-heavyweight boxers
Mediterranean Games bronze medalists for Italy
Competitors at the 1979 Mediterranean Games
Mediterranean Games medalists in boxing